The Shire of Wiluna is a local government area in the Goldfields-Esperance region (since 2021) of Western Australia, about  northeast of the state capital, Perth.

History
The Wiluna Road District was gazetted on 29 October 1909, largely formed out of part of the abolished Nannine Road District. On 1 July 1961, it became a shire following the passage of the Local Government Act 1960, which reformed all road districts into shires. On 1 July 1993, the eastern half of the Shire abutting the State's border with the Northern Territory was incorporated as the Shire of Ngaanyatjarraku.

The shire is predominantly mining and pastoral land. There are 27 pastoral leases within the shire; 15 of which are owned by families or pastoral companies, ten of which are owned by mining companies, two are owned by the Department of Environment and Conservation (DEC). Both of the stations that are owned by the DEC are destocked and run as nature reserves; many of the leases owned by mining companies have also been destocked.

Wards
The Shire is no longer divided into wards and the seven councillors sit at large.

Towns and localities
The towns and localities of the Shire of Wiluna with population and size figures based on the most recent Australian census:

Heritage-listed places

As of 2023, 38 places are heritage-listed in the Shire of Wiluna, of which two are on the State Register of Heritage Places.

References

External links
 

 
Wiluna